Glyphodes kunupialis is a moth in the family Crambidae. It was described by Anthonie Johannes Theodorus Janse in 1928. It is found on New Guinea.

References

Moths described in 1928
Glyphodes